Cyperacarus is a genus of flat mites in the family Tenuipalpidae, containing the following species:

 Cyperacarus foliatus Beard & Ochoa, 2011
 Cyperacarus naomae Beard & Ochoa, 2011

References

External links

Trombidiformes genera